Acta Mechanica is a peer-reviewed English, scientific journal publishing articles in the field of theoretical and applied mechanics, specifically in solid mechanics and fluid mechanics, published by Springer. The editor-in-chief is Hans Irschik (Johannes Kepler University Linz). Other Editors are M. Krommer (Vienna University of Technology), C. Marchioli (University of Udine), Martin Ostoja-Starzewski (University of Illinois at Urbana-Champaign), and George J. Weng (Rutgers University).

Abstracting and indexing
The journal is abstracted and indexed in:

According to the Journal Citation Reports, the journal has a 2021 impact factor of 2.645.

See also
 Aristoteles Philippidis

References

External links
 

Physics journals
English-language journals
Engineering journals
Springer Science+Business Media academic journals
Publications established in 1965
Monthly journals